Anthony Dasan is an Indian folk singer, who is currently working in the Tamil film industry. He is known for contributing a powerful voice to fusions of Tamil-folk, country, jazz, electronica and rock styles. Before this phase of playback singing, "Antony Dasan" worked as a travelling festival folk singer artist, collaborating with players of Nadaswaram, Thavil and Thappu, dancers and acrobats among others. He has performed with influential movie industry veterans such as Usha Uthup.

Apart from his musical performances, he has also made cameo appearances in Tamil films, particularly in songs sung by himself, notable of which is a cameo as a gangster in the Karthik Subbaraj directorial, Jigarthanda. Earlier he also featured in The Dewarists, a musical television series in India, which is partly a music documentary and partly a travelogue.

Biography 

Originally from Reddypalayam, a small town in Tanjore, he has a traditional musician-family background without formal training except daily practice supporting his family with his singing, following processions since he was a child. His father was a disabled Nadaswaram musician. Daasan, developed a style able to meet the volume of the famously-loud Nadaswaram horn. Being a Christian, Anthony had early experience with village church singing. During 2013, is style of band-leading, singing, lyrics, composition, dance, acrobatics and urumee playing came together, reflecting an entire life lived as an entertainer.

He also performed in Airtel Supersinger in Vijay tv but he was eliminated only to be called by Anirudh for a song in his upcoming movie with VJS

Fresh talents playing with Daasan have included Santhosh Narayanan, Sean Roldan, Vishal Chandrasekar, Anirudh Hiphop Tamizha, and Siddharth Vipin.

Bands 
Anthony Travels & Performs with his Band - "Anthonyin party", an electronic folk-fusion band. He was also associated with La Pongal, another folk-fusion band, organized by Darbuka Siva, which also had yet another notable singer/musician Pradeep. The band gained popularity among festival circuits. Eventually Anthony Daasan, along with the band, performed "Vandiyila Nellu Varum", one of their most popular compositions, in MTV Coke Studio India 2012, alongside veteran singer Usha Uthup. Anthony Daasan performed “Musical Nights” for New Jersey Tamil Peravai - Fall Festival 2020 which was streamed live in YouTube on November 20, 2020.

Awards 
In September 2014, Anthony was presented with the "Hope of Tamil Cinema Award," including recognition as "symbol of folk". The award ceremony was filmed at Pradharshini 2014 South-India cultural festival. He won the SIIMA Award for Best Male Playback Singer in Tamil at the 8th South Indian International Movie Awards.

Discography

Film songs

Albums

Composer

Filmography 
Soodhu Kavvum (2013) as singer in song "Kaasu Panam"
Jigarthanda (2014) as Vettu Kumar
Tagaru (2018) (Kannada) as singer in song "Tagaru Banthu Tagaru"
Jackpot (2019) as Pannaiyar
Repeat Shoe (2022)
Vallavanukkum Vallavan (2023)

References

External links 
 

Indian male playback singers
Indian male folk singers
Tamil-language lyricists
Indian male singer-songwriters
Indian singer-songwriters
Living people
Tamil folk singers
Tamil playback singers
Singers from Tamil Nadu
People from Thanjavur
Tamil film score composers
1977 births
Telugu playback singers